Sree Narayana Trust, Kerala was formed under the aegis of Sree Narayana Dharma Paripalana Yogam started more than a century ago by the followers of Sree Narayana Guru, who traveled all over South Indian and Sri Lanka to propagate his teachings.

Sree Narayana Dharma Paripalana (SNDP) Yogam founded schools and colleges in independent India. Previously, the only private colleges were those managed by the Church. The movement started with Sree Narayana College, Kollam. Many educational institutions were started thereafter under the leadership of SNDP Yogam. But as the number of such institutions grew, the Yogam transferred management of the institution to the Sree Narayana Trust.

SNDP yogam
 VPM SNDP Higher Secondary School, Kazhibram
 R. Shankar Memorial Arts and Science College
SNDPYHSS, Neeravil
SNDPHSS, Chenneerkara
SNDPHSS, Muttathukonam
SNDPHSS, Karamveli
SNDPHSS, Edapariyaram
SNDPLPS, Muttathukonam
SNDPHSS, Venkurunji
SNDPLPS, Mukkalumon
SNDPUPS, Mekozhoor
SNDPUPS, Thalachira
SNDPUPS, Thirumoolapuram
SNDPUPS, V- Kottayam
VISWABHARATHI SNDPHSS, Njeezhoor
SNDPHSS, Kiliroor
SNDPVHSS, Adimali
SNDPHSS, Udayamperur
SNDPHSS, Muvattuppuzha
SNDPHSS, Aluva
SNDPHSS, Neeleswaram
SNDPHS, Neeleshwaram
SNDPHSS, Pallissery
VPM SNDPHSS, Kazhimbram
Note: This list is not complete. Several S.N.D.P branches (Shakha yogams) run educational and other institutions.

SN Trust

Sree Narayana Trust, Kollam, operates:

 S.N Training College, Nedunganda
 S.N Trust H.S.S, Kollam
 S.N Trust Central School, Shoranur
 S.N Polytechnic College, Kottiyam
Sree Narayana Guru College of Legal Studies
Sree Narayana Guru College Of Advanced Studies, Nattika

Sree Narayana Educational Society, Kollam

Sree Narayana Gurukulam Trust

This trust is run by Kunnathunadu SNDP Union, Ernakulam
Sree Narayana Gurukulam College of Engineering, Kadayirruppu, Kolenchery

Sree Narayana Mandira Samiti, Mumbai

 Sree Narayana Guru High School, Chembur

Vidya International Charitable Trust
 Vidya Academy of Science and Technology in Thrissur

See also 
 Sree Narayana Dharma Sangham
 Sivagiri, Kerala
 Sree Dharma Paripalana Yogam
 Temples consecrated by Narayana Guru

Narayana Guru
Hindu organizations
Education in Tamil Nadu
Lists of universities and colleges in Kerala